Karel Komzák may refer to:

 Karel Komzák I (1823–1893), a Bohemian composer, organist, bandmaster and conductor
 Karel Komzák II (1850–1905), a Bohemian-born Viennese composer of dances and marches